Once Upon a Dream is the debut solo concert residency / cabaret act by American singer Lea Michele. The residency was performed at Feinstein's at the Loews Regency in New York City. It was performed at the time while Michele was starring on Broadway in  Spring Awakening and prior before being cast as Rachel Berry on Glee. It showcases the stage and future screen star performing of variety of dream Broadway role songs honoring the women that inspired her. The show was initially a one night only concert on February 25, 2008. However, due to an overwhelming sold out success, Michele performed 2 encore engagements.

Michele later updated the show bringing it to Los Angeles' Upright Cabaret at Mark's Restaurant in West Hollywood for 3 sold-out shows in August 2008. That engagement marked as her West Coast debut.

Setlist
The following setlist is obtained from the debut concert on February 25, 2008. It is not a representation of all shows on the residency.

"Not For The Life of Me" from Thoroughly Modern Millie
"Once Upon a Dream" / "Someone Like You"  from Jekyll and Hyde
"Easy To Be Hard"  from Hair
"Waiting For Life"  from Once On This Island
"I Don't Know How To Love Him"  from Jesus Christ Superstar
"Touch Me"  from Spring Awakening
"Another Day"
"Say It Somehow"  from The Light in the Piazza
"Somewhere"  from West Side Story
"Now While I'm Around"  from Sweeney Todd - Duet with Landon Beard
"The Wizard and I"  from Wicked
"Not A Day Goes By"  from Merrily We Roll Along
"Life Of The Party"  from The Wild Party
"On My Own"  from Les Misérables

Notes
"You'll Never Get Away From Me" from Gypsy was performed with Jonathan Groff at the April 7th, 2008 show
"A Little Fall Of Rain" from Les Misérables was performed with John Lloyd Young during the Los Angeles shows.
John Lloyd Young performed a mini set of "Can't Take My Eyes Off Of You" and "Multitudes of Amys" while Michele did a wardrobe change during the Los Angeles shows

Dates

References

Lea Michele